Thalassicolla is a radiolarian genus reported in the Thalassicollidae. The genus contains bioluminescent species. It is a genus of solitary (not colonial) radiolarians.

Species
The following species are recognized (incomplete list):
 Thalassicolla nucleata Huxley, 1851

References

Radiolarian genera
Bioluminescent radiolarians